The 2010 Monza GP3 Series round was a GP3 Series motor race held on September 11 and 12, 2010 at the Autodromo Nazionale Monza, Monza, in Italy. It was the final round in the 2010 GP3 Series. The race was run in support of the 2010 Italian Grand Prix.

Classification

Qualifying

Feature Race

Sprint Race

See also 
 2010 Italian Grand Prix
 2010 Monza GP2 Series round

References

Monza
Monza Gp3 Round, 2010